Lyde Irby Darlington House, also known as the Monroe House, is a historic home located at Laurens, Laurens County, South Carolina. It was built about 1899, and is a two-story, eclectic frame dwelling with elements of the Queen Anne, Eastlake, and Classical Revival styles. Notable features include polygonal bays and a wraparound porch.

It was added to the National Register of Historic Places in 1986.

References

Houses on the National Register of Historic Places in South Carolina
Queen Anne architecture in South Carolina
Neoclassical architecture in South Carolina
Houses completed in 1899
Houses in Laurens County, South Carolina
National Register of Historic Places in Laurens County, South Carolina